Pool B of the 2019 Rugby World Cup began on 21 September 2019. The pool included title holders New Zealand and third-placed team from 2015 South Africa, while Italy also joined the pool after finishing third in their pool in 2015. They were joined by the African qualifier, Namibia, and the repechage winner, Canada.

Neither of the final two matches in the pool were played due to the effects of Typhoon Hagibis; New Zealand were a point behind South Africa, who had played all four of their matches, going into the final game against Italy, so the two points awarded for the cancelled match saw New Zealand take top spot in the pool, while Italy finished third behind South Africa. Neither Namibia nor Canada managed a win in their first three matches, and the cancellation of their final match meant they finished level on points, with Namibia finishing higher on points difference.

Overview
Pool B started with New Zealand beating South Africa 23–13. New Zealand opened their scoring with two tries in four minutes from George Bridge and Scott Barrett giving New Zealand a 17–3 lead at half-time. Pieter-Steph du Toit scored a converted try to bring the score back to 17–10 but two penalties from Richie Mo'unga and Beauden Barrett sealed the result. In Higashiōsaka, Italy conceded an early try against Namibia before running away with a bonus-point victory by 25 points. Italy earned a second bonus-point victory in Fukuoka, scoring seven tries in a 48–7 demolition of Canada. Over in Toyota, South Africa defeated Namibia by 54 points, scoring nine tries while Namibia could manage only a Cliven Loubser penalty in the 23rd minute. New Zealand recorded their second victory of the World Cup with a 63–0 victory over Canada at Ōita Stadium. For New Zealand, Brad Weber scored his first two tries in international rugby with the Barrett brothers (Jordie Barrett, Beauden Barrett and Scott Barrett) each scoring a try as they became first trio of brothers to start for New Zealand.

New Zealand would continue their demolition of their opponents with a 62-point win over Namibia in Chōfu, with the floodgates opening in the second half after Namibia restricted the All Blacks to 24 points in the first half. Sevu Reece, Ben Smith and Anton Lienert-Brown scoring two tries in the match. Between the two New Zealand games, South Africa romped over Italy with Cheslin Kolbe scoring two tries as the South Africans won 49–3 in Fukuroi. This was followed by a 66–7 victory over Canada with Cobus Reinach scoring the fastest hat-trick in World Cup history, with his three tries being scored in a space of 11 minutes. The final two matches of the group would not be played as Typhoon Hagibis would see the cancellation of the New Zealand–Italy and Namibia–Canada matches. At the end of the pool stage, New Zealand finished on top of the table with South Africa finishing second.

Standings

All times are local Japan Standard Time (UTC+09)

New Zealand vs South Africa

Notes:
Duane Vermeulen (South Africa) earned his 50th test cap.

Italy vs Namibia

Notes:
PJ Walters (Namibia) made his international debut.
Darryl de la Harpe (Namibia) earned his 50th test cap.

Italy vs Canada

Notes:
Djustice Sears-Duru (Canada) earned his 50th test cap.
This was Italy's biggest winning margin at a Rugby World Cup.

South Africa vs Namibia

New Zealand vs Canada

Notes:
Beauden Barrett, Jordie Barrett and Scott Barrett became the first trio of brothers to start for New Zealand in a World Cup match, and the first to all start in a World Cup match since Elisi Vunipola, Manu Vunipola, and Fe'ao Vunipola all played for Tonga in 1995. The Barrett brothers also became the first trio of brothers to all score a try in the same match.
Richie Mo'unga's eight successful conversion attempts is the most without missing in a Rugby World Cup match.

South Africa vs Italy

Notes:
Sergio Parisse played in his 15th World Cup match, an Italian record.
Andrea Lovotti became the fourth player to receive a red during the 2019 World Cup, matching a tournament high set in 1995 and 1999.
With injuries to both the starting tighthead and reserve tighthead for Italy, scrums went uncontested from the 18th minute.
No replacement was issued for Cheslin Kolbe.

New Zealand vs Namibia

South Africa vs Canada

Notes:
Cobus Reinach (South Africa) scored the fastest hat-trick in a World Cup match, with just 11 minutes between his first and third tries.

New Zealand vs Italy

Notes:
As a result of inclement weather caused by Typhoon Hagibis this match was cancelled and awarded as a 0–0 draw.

Namibia vs Canada

Notes:
Despite both teams naming their sides, this match was cancelled following an evacuation order in Kamaishi during Typhoon Hagibis and awarded as a 0–0 draw.

References

Pool B
2019–20 in Italian rugby union
2019 in South African rugby union
2019 in New Zealand rugby union